The following highways are numbered 470:

Brazil
 BR-470

Canada
 Manitoba Provincial Road 470
 New Brunswick Route 470
 Newfoundland and Labrador Route 470

Japan
 Japan National Route 470

United States
  Interstate 470
  Colorado State Highway 470
  E-470
  Florida State Road 470
 Iowa Highway 470
  Kentucky Route 470
  Maryland Route 470
  New York State Route 470
  Puerto Rico Highway 470